Spider-Man: Mysterio's Menace is a 2001 action video game based on the Marvel Comics character Spider-Man. It was developed by Vicarious Visions and published by Activision for the Game Boy Advance. The game is a standalone sequel to Spider-Man (2000) and Spider-Man 2: Enter Electro (2001). It was released on September 18, 2001 in North America, and on April 26, 2002 in Japan. The game was later re-released on a Twin Pack cartridge bundled with X2: Wolverine's Revenge in 2005.

Plot
Taking place possibly a few months after Spider-Man 2: Enter Electro, the game begins with Peter Parker's wife Mary Jane Watson reminding him to buy a new fishbowl for their fish. After a news report however, Peter changes to Spider-Man and tries to investigate a few criminal activities all taking place in one night, which pits him against a rogue's gallery of villains, including Rhino, Hammerhead, Big Wheel, Electro and Scorpion. They are led by the game's titular antagonist: the Master of Illusion, Mysterio. After subduing his fellow super-villains, Spider-Man defeats Mysterio himself in the final level. Mysterio escapes, but leaves his helmet behind. Peter brings it back home to Mary Jane as their new fishbowl.

Gameplay
The game has 7 stages, each featuring a boss at the end – Hammerhead (who appears at the end of two levels), Big Wheel, Electro, Rhino, Scorpion and Mysterio as the final boss. The player can choose between three stages to begin with, each opening a further level after completion and concluding the story for that part of the game with comic book-styled cutscenes. The game allows players to freely web swing, attack with different punches and kicks, and to shoot web at foes to capture or attack them whilst progressing through levels and avoiding obstacles such as razors and fire. The player can collect upgrades to enhance Spider-Man's strength, health and webbing, as well as "suits" that enhance and protect him from certain obstacles. The final upgrade is the Symbiote Suit, which slowly replenishes Spider-Man's health and web, and is obtained in the final level.

Reception

The game received "favorable" reviews according to the review aggregation website Metacritic.  In Japan, Famitsu gave it a score of all four sevens for a total of 28 out of 40.

References

External links

2001 video games
Activision games
Game Boy Advance games
Game Boy Advance-only games
Video games based on Spider-Man
Video games set in New York City
Superhero video games
Video games developed in the United States
Single-player video games
Vicarious Visions games
Video game sequels